Dame Ingrid Ann Simler, DBE (born 17 September 1963), styled The Rt Hon Lady Justice Simler, is a judge of the Court of Appeal of England and Wales.

She was educated at Henrietta Barnett School, Sidney Sussex College, Cambridge and the University of Amsterdam.

She was called to the bar at Inner Temple in 1987 and became a QC 2006. Simler was appointed a Recorder in 2002 and was a judge of the High Court of Justice (Queen's Bench Division) from 2013. She was President of the Employment Appeal Tribunal for a term of three years from 1 January 2016 to 31 December 2018.

On 27 June 2018, it was announced that Simler was to be appointed to the Court of Appeal, an appointment she took up on 2 July 2019.

Simler was chair of the Equality and Diversity Committee of the Bar Council of England and Wales, and at the date of announcement of her appointment to the High Court bench in 2013 she was head of her chambers. She is the chair of the Equality, Diversity and Inclusion sub-committee of the Inner Temple.

References

1963 births
Living people
People educated at Henrietta Barnett School
Alumni of Sidney Sussex College, Cambridge
University of Amsterdam alumni
Members of the Inner Temple
Queen's Bench Division judges
British women judges
English women judges
Dames Commander of the Order of the British Empire
English King's Counsel
Lady Justices of Appeal
Members of the Privy Council of the United Kingdom